Michele Margaret Timms  (born 28 June 1965) is an Australian basketball coach and retired professional basketball player who played for the Phoenix Mercury in the Women's National Basketball Association(WNBA). Many people consider the Melbourne native to be one of Australia's greatest basketball players of all time. She has one daughter, Kalsie Timms. Timms was inducted into the Women's Basketball Hall of Fame in 2008. She was inducted into the FIBA Hall of Fame in 2016.

WNBL career 
Timms played for four clubs in her WNBL career: Bulleen, Nunawading, Perth and Sydney. In 2005, Timms was honoured by the WNBL with the creation of the Michele Timms Cup. The cup is presented to the winner of the Bulleen Boomers-Dandenong Rangers derbies.

WNBA career 
At the onset of the WNBA in 1997, she went to the Phoenix Mercury, for whom she played in the finals in 1998, losing to the Houston Comets. Timms came within inches of giving the Mercury their first title that year; with the Mercury up 1-0 and needing only one more win for the championship, and Game Two tied at 66 with three seconds to go, Timms took a three-point shot that bounced off the rim's back. Ultimately, the Comets won that game 74–69 in overtime, and then the championship in Game Three. In 2001, Timms announced her retirement and almost immediately joined the Mercury's television broadcasting crew, a job which she held only for that season. She averaged 4.6 points and 4.0 assists per game with the Mercury; her highest scoring average in one season being 12.1 points per game in 1997. On 7 August 2002, her number 7 jersey became the first to be retired by the Phoenix Mercury, and only the second jersey ever retired by the WNBA. Upon her retirement, she was the Mercury's career leader in assists.

In February 2005, the Phoenix Mercury announced that she had been signed as an assistant coach under fellow Australian and Mercury head coach Carrie Graf.

Timms played a very influential role in opening the flood gate for many of the future international women's players, especially Australian women basketball stars.

International career 
Timms began her professional basketball career in 1984 in Australia. In 1989, she became the first Australian (male or female) to play professional basketball internationally when she went to Germany to play with the Lotus München team. While there, she got a chance to play alongside Marlies Askamp, who would later also play with her on the Mercury. While there, she was named the Women's International Player of The Year in 1994 and 1996. She was selected to the WNBL All team 7 times (1988–92, 1994, 1996)

Also in 1996, at her second Summer Olympics, she helped the Australian national women's basketball team earn their first Olympic medal, a bronze at the Atlanta competition. Four years later Timms was on the squad that captured the silver medal in front of their own crowd.

Coaching career 
She worked as the basketball development officer/ assistant coach for the South Dragons in the Australian National Basketball League. During her time with the Dragons, she impressed many of the club's staff and players with her sound knowledge of the game and excellent coaching skills. She left the club on 9 January 2008 and during the middle of the Dragons' season, to fulfill her career ambitions by moving to the United States.

She was an assistant coach with China women's national basketball team, reuniting her with her former Opals coach Tom Maher.

In 2009 Timms was appointed as an assistant coach of the Jayco Australian Opals, the Australia women's national basketball team. She was also appointed an assistant coach of the Global Metals Bulleen Boomers in the Women's National Basketball League.
After the 2012 Olympics where Timms was Assistant Coach to the Australian Women's Team, Timms took the Assistant Coaching roll of the next Olympic Cycle with China 2013–2016.  After the 2016 Olympics Timms stayed on with the Chinese Women's Basketball Team unit 2018.

Timms worked with Beijing WCBA Team in 2017-2018 Season as Assistant Coach with Sylvia Fowles as their Import. The team won the WCBA Championship.

April 2018 Timms heads back to Australia to establish her own Company "Michele Timms Elite Sports Coaching" and under this umbrella starts the Michele Timms Basketball Academy.

Honours 
Timms was named the Women's International Player of The Year in 1994 and 1996. She received an Australian Sports Medal in 2000 and was inducted into the Sport Australia Hall of Fame in 2003. In 2008 Timms was elected to the Women's Basketball Hall of Fame in Knoxville, Tennessee.

On 17 August 2016 Timms was inducted into the FIBA Hall of Fame.

Timms was made a Member of the Order of Australia in the 2018 Australia Day Honours "For significant service to basketball as a competitor at the national and international level, as an Olympic athlete, and as a mentor for women in sport."

Career statistics

Regular season

|-
| style="text-align:left;"|1997
| style="text-align:left;"|Phoenix
| 27 || 27 || 35.8 || .336 || .345 || .760 || 3.7 || 5.1 || 2.6 || 0.1 || 3.0 || 12.1
|-
| style="text-align:left;"|1998
| style="text-align:left;"|Phoenix
| 30 || 30 || 31.1 || .318 || .298 || .694 || 2.5 || 5.3 || 1.3 || 0.1 || 2.3 || 6.9
|-
| style="text-align:left;"|1999
| style="text-align:left;"|Phoenix
| 30 || 29 || 26.8 || .354 || .348 || .776 || 2.6 || 5.0 || 1.4 || 0.2 || 3.0 || 6.8
|-
| style="text-align:left;"|2000
| style="text-align:left;"|Phoenix
| 8 || 8 || 22.0 || .367 || .235 || 1.000 || 2.0 || 2.3 || 1.9 || 0.3 || 2.3 || 3.8
|-
| style="text-align:left;"|2001
| style="text-align:left;"|Phoenix
| 21 || 18 || 19.4 || .345 || .304 || .800 || 2.1 || 4.1 || 1.0 || 0.1 || 2.0 || 4.7
|-
| style="text-align:left;"|Career
| style="text-align:left;"|5 years, 1 team
| 116 || 112 || 28.3 || .338 || .324 || .755 || 2.7 || 4.8 || 1.6 || 0.2 || 2.6 || 6.0

Playoffs

|-
| style="text-align:left;"|1997
| style="text-align:left;"|Phoenix
| 1 || 1 || 40.0 || .091 || .000 || .600 || 4.0 || 1.0 || 4.0 || 0.0 || 2.0 || 5.0
|-
| style="text-align:left;"|1998
| style="text-align:left;"|Phoenix
| 6 || 6 || 34.7 || .352 || .273 || 1.000 || 3.3 || 5.2 || 0.8 || 0.0 || 3.5 || 9.0
|-
| style="text-align:left;"|Career
| style="text-align:left;"|2 years, 1 team
| 7 || 7 || 35.4 || .308 || .250 || .867 || 3.4 || 4.6 || 1.3 || 0.0 || 3.3 || 8.4

See also 
 List of Australian WNBA players

References 

1965 births
Living people
Australian expatriate basketball people in the United States
Australian women's basketball players
Basketball players at the 1988 Summer Olympics
Basketball players at the 1996 Summer Olympics
Basketball players at the 2000 Summer Olympics
Australian expatriate basketball people in Germany
FIBA Hall of Fame inductees
Medalists at the 1996 Summer Olympics
Medalists at the 2000 Summer Olympics
Phoenix Mercury players
Point guards
Olympic basketball players of Australia
Olympic bronze medalists for Australia
Olympic medalists in basketball
Olympic silver medalists for Australia
Recipients of the Australian Sports Medal
Sport Australia Hall of Fame inductees
Sportswomen from Victoria (Australia)
Women's National Basketball Association All-Stars
Members of the Order of Australia